Eliesse Ben Seghir (born 16 February 2005) is a French professional footballer who plays as an attacking midfielder for Ligue 1 club Monaco.

Club career
Ben Seghir is a youth product of the academies of SC Cogolinois, Fréjus Saint-Raphaël, and Monaco. He signed his first professional contract with Monaco on 5 August 2022, and made his senior and professional debut with the club as a late substitute in a 4–1 UEFA Europa League win over Red Star Belgrade on 3 November 2022.

On 28 December 2022, Ben Seghir made his Ligue 1 debut for Monaco as a half-time substitute in a match against Auxerre. He scored two goals, both of which put Monaco in the lead, to help his team come out victorious by a score of 3–2.

International career
Ben Seghir is a youth international for France, having played for the France U18s.

Personal life
Born in France, Ben Seghir is of Moroccan descent. He is the younger brother of fellow footballer Salim Ben Seghir.

References

External links
 
 FFF Profile
 

2005 births
Living people
People from Saint-Tropez
French footballers
France youth international footballers
French sportspeople of Moroccan descent
Association football midfielders
AS Monaco FC players
French expatriate footballers
French expatriate sportspeople in Monaco
Expatriate footballers in Monaco